Charles A. Langlois (born 22 March 1938) was a member of the House of Commons of Canada from 1988 to 1993. His background was in administration.

Langlois was born in Sainte-Marthe-de-Gaspé, Quebec and was educated at Collège Notre-Dame-des-Champs. He was elected in the 1988 federal election at the Manicouagan electoral district for the Progressive Conservative Party. He succeeded Prime Minister Brian Mulroney, who ran and was elected in the Charlevoix riding instead. Langlois held membership in the provincial Quebec Liberal Party at the time, but encouraged federal voters in Quebec to "elect a member on the government side" namely the Progressive Conservatives under Mulroney. He served in the 34th Canadian Parliament, after which he lost his seat to Bloc Québécois candidate Bernard St-Laurent in the 1993 federal election.

References

External links

1938 births
Living people
Members of the House of Commons of Canada from Quebec
People from Gaspésie–Îles-de-la-Madeleine
Progressive Conservative Party of Canada MPs